Ablaberoides tardus are a species of beetles first discovered by Louis Albert Péringuey in 1904. No subspecies are listed in the Catalogue of Life.

References 

Melolonthinae